Ipomoea triloba is a species of Ipomoea morning glory known by several common names, including littlebell and Aiea morning glory. It is native to the tropical Americas, but it is widespread in warm areas of the world, where it is an introduced species and often a noxious weed. The leaves sometimes, but not always, have three lobes. The vines produce tubular bell-shaped flowers, each about two centimeters long. They are quite variable in color, in shades of pink, red or lavender, with or without white markings.

References

External links

Jepson Manual Treatment
PIER Species Profile

triloba
Plants described in 1753
Taxa named by Carl Linnaeus